Carham or Carham on Tweed is a village in Northumberland, England. According to the United Kingdom Census 2011, it is the place in England with greatest proportion of Scottish-born people, at approximately 33%.

Etymology

Carham has generally been etymologised as an Old English place-name. The first syllable would be from carr 'rock', and the second either a dative plural ending (the whole name having been carrum '(at the) rocks') or the word hām ('homestead'). However, the twelfth-century chronicler Richard of Hexham appears not to have considered the name an English one, so it may actually come from Cumbric *kair 'fortification'.

History 

Near to Carham are the extensive remains of Early British camps and a bronze sword, now in the British Museum, discovered in the nearby Tweed.

Carham on the Tweed, where a stream divides Northumberland from Scotland, was the scene of two battles in Anglo-Saxon times.

In 833 the Danes fought the English, and the English were routed. Leland tells us that

in the 33rd year of Ecbright the Danes arrived at Lindisfarne and fought with the English at Carham where Eleven Bishops and two English Countes were slayne, and a great numbre of people.

A field between the glebe and Dunstan Wood, where bones have been from time to time disinterred, is probably the site of the battle.

In 1018 the Battle of Carham between the Kingdom of Scotland and the Northumbrians resulted in a Scottish victory. The fact that the Tweed is the border between Scotland and England can be traced to the outcome of this battle.

James VI of Scotland crossed the border on 26 April 1588 and visited Carham.

Governance 
Carham is in the parliamentary constituency of Berwick-upon-Tweed.

Religious sites 
The church is dedicated to St Cuthbert.

References

External links

The Official Carham Parish Website
GENUKI (accessed: 19 November 2008)

Villages in Northumberland